Freedom and Rain is a 1990 album by British folk rock band Oysterband and singer June Tabor. The album features a mixture of traditional material and contemporary covers including "Lullaby of London" by Shane MacGowan, "All Tomorrow's Parties" by Lou Reed, "Valentine's Day Is Over" by Billy Bragg and "Night Comes In" by Richard Thompson.

Oysterband and Tabor would reunite for the 2011 album Ragged Kingdom.

Track listing
 "Mississippi" (Si Kahn) - 3:18
 "Lullaby of London" (Shane MacGowan) - 2:45
 "Night Comes In" (Richard Thompson) - 4:54
 "Valentine's Day Is Over" (Billy Bragg) - 3:26
 "All Tomorrow's Parties" (Lou Reed) - 3:47
 "Dives and Lazarus" (Trad.) - 4:18
 "Dark Eyed Sailor" (Trad.) - 4:15
 "Pain or Paradise" (John Tams) - 3:13
 "Susie Clelland" (Trad.) - 5:16
 "Finisterre" (Ian Telfer) - 3:45

External links
 Allmusic review

1990 albums
June Tabor albums
Oysterband albums
Cooking Vinyl albums